Deshler High School is the sole public secondary education institution in Tuscumbia, Alabama.
'Undefeated Football team in Region.

References

External links 
 Deshler High School

Public high schools in Alabama
Schools in Colbert County, Alabama